Phyllocrania is a genus of mantis in the family Hymenopodidae, containing three species, Phyllocrania illudens, Phyllocrania insignis, Phyllocrania paradoxa.

See also
List of mantis genera and species
Dead leaf mantis

References

Hymenopodidae
Mantodea of Africa
Mantodea genera
Taxa named by Hermann Burmeister